Derby Field  is a public airport nine miles southwest of Lovelock, in Pershing County, Nevada. The National Plan of Integrated Airport Systems for 2011–2015 categorized it as a general aviation facility.

Facilities
Derby Field covers 550 acres (223 ha) at an elevation of 3,907 feet (1,191 m). It has two runways: 2/20 is 5,529 by 75 feet (1,685 x 23 m) and 8/26 is 4,931 by 75 feet (1,503 x 23 m).

In the year ending June 30, 2012 the airport had 1,295 general aviation aircraft operations, average 107 per month. Two aircraft were then based at the airport, both single-engine.

In Popular Culture 
Derby Field has had many references in popular culture, mostly due to its IATA code, LOL, being the same as the common internet acronym.

The airport was featured in multiple YouTube videos by CGP Grey, an educational youtuber.

References

External links 
 Derby Field at Pershing County website
  from Nevada DOT
 Aerial image as of June 1994 from USGS The National Map
 

Airports in Nevada
Transportation in Pershing County, Nevada
Buildings and structures in Pershing County, Nevada
Humboldt River